Verrua may refer to:

Verrua Po, a comune in Lombardy, northern Italy
Verrua Savoia, a comune in Piedmont, northern Italy